Darron John Reekers (born 26 May 1973) is a former New Zealand cricketer who played for the Netherlands national cricket team. He played as a right-handed batsman and a right-arm medium pace bowler. He originally played cricket in his native New Zealand, playing for Canterbury between 1994 and 2002, with one season for Otago in 1997/98.

He first played for the Netherlands national cricket team against Norfolk in the C&G Trophy on 29 August 2001. He did not become eligible to represent them in international competition until 2004, when he played in the 2004 ICC Six Nations Challenge.

References

External links

People educated at St Thomas of Canterbury College
Dutch cricketers
Netherlands One Day International cricketers
Netherlands Twenty20 International cricketers
Canterbury cricketers
Otago cricketers
1973 births
Living people
Cricketers from Christchurch
Dutch people of New Zealand descent
New Zealand cricketers